Otava Publishing Company Ltd is a major Finnish publisher of books. It was founded in 1890 and is now the second largest publisher in Finland. It publishes fiction, non-fiction, books for teenagers and children, multimedia and teaching materials. The number of new titles exceeds 400 a year. Otava has also been at the forefront of encyclopedia publishing in Finland with many well-known series, such as the Otavan Suuri Ensyklopedia (The Great Otava Encyclopedia). Writers whose work Otava has published over the years include Frans Emil Sillanpää, Eino Leino, Paavo Haavikko, Pentti Saarikoski and Laila Hirvisaari. The parent company Otava Group also owns the major bookstore chain, Suomalainen Kirjakauppa.

The name "Otava" refers to the Big Dipper.

History 
Otava was founded in 1890 by Hannes Gebhard and Eliel Aspelin-Haapkylä to publish Finnish national literature.  became managing director in 1893 and was the main figure during the company's early years. His descendants (surname fennicized to Reenpää) have continued his work so that Otava remains, in spite of its size, to a large extent a family company. 1906 saw the completion of the new headquarters right in the centre of Helsinki. In 1908 printing press operations began and in 1916 the printing of magazines got under way. The first magazine to be launched was Suomen Kuvalehti, which still comes out weekly. From 1945 to 1991 the company was listed in the Helsinki Stock Exchange. In 1955 a new printing house was put up in Keuruu, near Jyväskylä. During the 1960s Otava faced grave financial difficulties but was able to pull through by rationalizing operations. In 1998 it bought out its rival company WSOY from the jointly owned Yhtyneet Kuvalehdet, a large publisher of magazines.

Publications
This is Finland (2007)

References

External links
 Otava

1890 establishments in Finland
Publishing companies established in 1890
Book publishing companies of Finland
Mass media companies of Finland
Art Nouveau architecture in Helsinki
Art Nouveau commercial buildings
Mass media in Helsinki